Ana Evelyn Karina Rando Huluk, better known as Karina Rando, is a Uruguayan anesthesiologist and politician of Open Cabildo (CA).

Daniel Salinas, the previous Minister of Public Health of Uruguay, resigned from office on 13 March 2023. Ever since, Rando is the current Minister.

References

External links 
 

University of the Republic (Uruguay) alumni
Uruguayan anesthesiologists
Open Cabildo (Uruguay) politicians
Women government ministers of Uruguay
Ministers for Public Health of Uruguay
Living people